Pustulibacterium is a Gram-negative, aerobic, non-spore-forming and non-motile genus of bacteria from the family of Flavobacteriaceae with one known species (Pustulibacterium marinum). Pustulibacterium marinum has been isolated from the Bashi Channel.

References

Flavobacteria
Bacteria genera
Monotypic bacteria genera
Taxa described in 2009